Balnakeil is a hamlet in the parish of Durness, Sutherland, Scottish Highlands, and is in the Scottish council area of Highland. The ruins of Balnakeil Church are a scheduled monument. The Kyle of Durness is west of Balnakeil which gives its name to the  Balnakeil Bay which the Kyle opens into.

The peninsula of Faraid Head is to the north of Balnakeil. It was the site of a 1950s radar station and remains the range control for Ministry of Defence bombing operations in the Cape Wrath Training Area to the west.

Three small lochs are to the south of Balnakeil: Loch Croispol, Loch Borralie and Loch Caladail. Durness Golf Course is to the southwest.

See also
Durness
Faraid Head
Cape Wrath

References

Populated places in Sutherland
Balnakeil